The 1918 occupation of Međimurje was takeover of the region of Međimurje by the forces deployed by the National Council of the State of Slovenes, Croats and Serbs in November and December 1918 in immediate aftermath of the World War I. The territory, predominantly inhabited by the Croats was a part of the Kingdom of Hungary until the troops under command of Colonel Slavko Kvaternik captured and added it to the just established Kingdom of Serbs, Croats and Slovenes.

The campaign to capture Međimurje began in November 1918 ostensibly in response to Hungarian authorities action to put down a revolt of population of Međimurje. The first intervention was quickly organised by Major Ivan Tomašević leading a force of about three hundred which was routed by Hungarian forces near Čakovec – the region's largest town. Pleas for military help directed to the Royal Serbian Army and the French Armée d'Orient were rebuffed due to obligations assumed under the Armistice of Belgrade between the Entente Powers and Hungary which defined the Drava River in as the line of Hungarian control in the area. A new effort was mounted by the National Council on 24 December using a 3,000-strong force comprising a significant part of the Royal Croatian Home Guard and volunteers. The second incursion into Međimurje was planned in greater detail by Major Dragutin Perko, who went on to command a large part of the forces advancing into Međimurje.

Međimurje was captured on 24 December without resistance from the Hungarian garrison. Perko was appointed its administrator, and the region was declared a part of the Kingdom of Serbs, Croats and Slovenes. The proclamation was made with a reference to the principle of self-determination. Addition of Međimurje to the Kingdom of Serbs, Croats and Slovenes was confirmed by the Paris Peace Conference.

Background
On 5–6 October 1918, representatives of political parties representing Slovenes, Croats, and Serbs living in Austria-Hungary organised the National Council of Slovenes, Croats and Serbs as the central organ of the newly proclaimed State of Slovenes, Croats and Serbs encompassing the Slovene Lands, Croatia-Slavonia, Dalmatia, and Bosnia and Herzegovina. The council supplanted the previously established ad hoc group known as the Yugoslav Committee as the body representing the interests of the South Slavs living in the Habsburg lands. Its original objective was to work to achieve independence of the South Slavs from Austria-Hungary and then arrange unification of those lands on the basis of Yugoslavist ideas with Serbia. The latter had stated its World War I objective of liberation and unification of the lands represented by the National Council in its 1914 Niš Declaration.

On 29 October, the Sabor of Croatia-Slavonia declared the end of political ties with Austria-Hungary and thus the independence of the State of Slovenes, Croats and Serbs. The council and Serbian representatives met in  Geneva, Switzerland in early November for talks where the former agreed with Serbian Prime Minister Nikola Pašić the provisional political system of the union with Serbia. The short-lived agreement known as the Geneva Declaration was repudiated by Serbia within days. Following the Armistice of Villa Giusti between the Entente Powers and Austria-Hungary, the Kingdom of Italy moved to secure a part of the territory claimed by the State of Slovenes, Croats and Serbs it was promised through the Treaty of London. They followed retreating Austro-Hungarian returning home from the Italian Front. Those based in Hungary were going home by trains running through Međimurje – a part of the Hungary's Zala County, located between the Drava and Mura rivers and inhabited predominantly by Croats. The overall security throughout Hungary and Croatia-Slavonia was poor because of Green Cadres – numerous deserters surviving through banditry.

First incursion

Prelude

In early November, a revolt erupted in several villages in the eastern Međimurje – and quickly spread across the region among the population. Although the revolt had the hallmarks of class struggle, the insurrectionists also targeted anyone they perceived as enemies on ethnic grounds. The revolt largely subsided by 4 November. The next day, the Zala County prefect authorised summary court-martial proceedings in Međimurje. Under this authority, more than one hundred people were summarily tried and executed by hanging or firing squad. Some civilians fled from the persecution South, across Drava into Croatia-Slavonia – most to the city of Varaždin, but also to Koprivnica. By 10 November, Hungarian regular troops restored control in nearly the entire region and gained control of the village of Nedelišće two days later as the last rebel stronghold.

A popular assembly was held in Varaždin on 10 November to discuss the developments in Međimurje, blaming mercenaries and Hungarian Green Cadres for the violence. National Council committees based in Varaždin and Koprivnica dispatched delegations to Zagreb to seek help from the central government and potentially from Colonel Dušan Simović who had just arrived to Zagreb as a representative of the Royal Serbian Army. In response, National Council defence commissioner  dispatched Major Ivan Tomašević and Lieutenant Viktor Debeljak to Varaždin to devise a plan for occupation of Međimurje. Tomašević found forces in Varaždin under command of Captain Stjepan Sertić – the commanding officer of the 3rd battalion of the 25th Infantry Regiment of the Royal Croatian Home Guard. In addition, there was a battalion raised largely among Međimurje refugees. There was also a National Guards volunteer detachment which included Varaždin high school students, nominally reporting to the National Council. The entire force consisted of approximately 300 troops, armed with weapons taken from Varaždin barracks and soldiers of the 14th Infantry Regiment of the Royal Hungarian Honvéd and the 33rd Infantry Regiment of the Common Army who were crossing Drava in Varaždin. Tomašević assumed overall command, Oberleutnant Franjo Glogovec led the Međumurje battalion, while Major Marko Georgijević led the volunteer troops.

The Regent directed Perko to meet Vojvoda Petar Mišić the next day on the matter. Mišić informed Perko that Serbia cannit intervene due to its commitment to the existing armistice, but promised support if forces of the State of Slovenes, Croats and Serbs capture Međimurje.

Repelled advance

On 13 November, another public assembly was held in Varaždin where Tomašević and mayor Pero Magdić announced their plan to launch an attack across Drava River into Međimurje that evening, at 10 p.m. Magdić pushed for a quick action hoping to improve his political standing and had a poster printed calling on volunteers to come forward. The available troops were escorted to the Drava River bridge by crowds. Once across, the attackers positioned several artillery pieces and split into three columns. The advance proceeded along the main road through the village of Pušćine. To his right, the volunteer force took the road to Čakovec through the village of Kuršanec. On the left flank, Glogovec led his troops through the village of Gornji Hrašćan before turning east towards Čakovec. According to Tomašević, the aim of the first stage of the operation was to capture Čakovec and establish a bridgehead across Drava before further advance is attempted. The advancing forces reached Čakovec in the morning of 14 November without encountering resistance. This matched the information available to the National Council, which indicated that Hungarian troops had withdrawn from Međimurje, except from Čakovec railway station. The forces tasked with security of the railway in Čakovec were under command of Major Károly Györy.

There are conflicting reports on time and direction of arrival of additional Hungarian troops to Čakovec, but the majority view is that a force several times larger than the opposition arrived by four trains from Nagykanizsa shortly before the troops commanded by Tomašević reached the town. The forces first clashed near Čakovec railway station where the Hungarian forces awaited the attackers in prepared positions. The forces commanded by Tomašević fled in disarray to Varaždin across Drava bridges or, after both of them were captured by Hungarian cavalry, swam across the river to safety. The fighting was concluded the same day in a truce concluded by the Varaždin County prefect Franjo Kulmer and Čakovec District chief justice Pál Huszár. They met again on 15 November to arrange restoration of Varaždin–Čakovec railway traffic and security control of traffic across Drava bridges. Since the city limits of Varaždin extended slightly north of the Drava River, Huszár agreed that no Hungarian forces would be posted at the bridges and the security left to the State of the Slovenes, Croats and Serbs to enforce. According to Simović, the Tomašević's defeat was the result of complete lack of preparation and caused considerable fear of a Hungarian attack against Varaždin. Contemporary press noted at least four attackers were killed.

Second incursion

Preparations for another push

On 16 November, Simović forwarded to Belgrade a new request for military intervention in Međimurje drawn up by the National Council. It included not only a request to capture Međimurje, but also set the request in a proposal to establish the Czech Corridor establishing an overland link to Czechoslovakia. This request was rejected three days later as impossible to grant without violating the Armistice of Belgrade concluded on 13 November establishing the Drava River as the boundary of the territory under Hungarian control in the area of Međimurje and Varaždin. In a report filed on 19 November by Hungarian envoy in Zagreb at the time Gyula Gömbös, it was noted that further military action against Hungarian interests in Međimurje was likely and that forces needed for this were assembling near Varaždin. On 23 November, the National Council wrote to General Louis Franchet d'Espèrey asking him to occupy Međimurje on the council's behalf. The new attempt at capturing Međimurje Gömbös referred to was planned for 6 December, with participation of a substantially greater force than the initial push, and Colonel Slavko Kvaternik was appointed by Drinković to lead the offensive. However, the attack was postponed following the armed conflict in Zagreb which took place just one day before the scheduled operation and within a week since proclamation of unification of the Kingdom of Serbs, Croats and Slovenes (Kingdom of SHS).

Kvaternik determined the postponed start of the offensive would be in the early morning of 24 December. Despite the recent unification of the Kingdom of SHS, the Royal Serbian Army did not absorb the forces deployed to the area of Varaždin in preparation of the attack into Međimurje. Those troops were still formally controlled by the National Council. On 11 December, Bojović was ordered not to cross the line (meaning Drava) determined by the Armistice of Belgrade. On 20 December, the supreme command of the Royal Serbian Army notified Colonel Milan Pribičević attached to the liaison office in Zagreb that neither the Serbian, nor the French Armée d'Orient would support the offensive directly.

Order of battle
The plan for the second incursion into Međimurje was prepared by Perko and finalised by Kvaternik. At his disposal, Kvaternik had 3000 troops assigned to seven battalions. They were equipped with 24 cannon, 52 machine guns, an armoured car and eleven lorries. The force also had two cavalry squadrons, a medic detachment, and a signal corps company. The attacking force was arrayed along two major axes. The bulk of the force advanced North from Varaždin to Čakovec under command of Perko. A smaller part of the force was deployed to the West of Međimurje under command of Major Ivo Henneberg, tasked with advancing East from Ormož to Čakovec and from the village of Štrigova along the Mura River. A reserve force consisted of one infantry battalion of Royal Serbian Army supported by a half of a cavalry squadron and a machine gun detachment led by Major Aksentije Radojković. The reserve was assembling near Varaždin and did not take part in the offensive actions. Kvaternik set up his headquarters in Varaždin to direct the entire operation. The Hungarian forces in Međimurje were considerably smaller. Most of them were stationed in Čakovec, with small contingents deployed in larger villages in the region. The force was commanded by Colonel György Kühn, and Györy as the second in command.

Renewed offensive

The attacking forces were tasked with capturing Čakovec as well as rail and road crossings of the Mura river in Mursko Središće and Kotoriba connecting Međimurje to the rest of the Zala County. Ultimately, the troops were tasked with securing control of the entire territory south of the Mura River. The attack commenced at 6 a.m. of 24 December. A part of the group led by Perko advanced along the main Varaždin–Čakovec road. By 8 a.m. forces led by Major Karlo Pogledić assisted by Tomašević (26th Infantry Regiment) completed unopposed Drava crossing in boats and on rafts procured from local population at the village of Hrženica. Then they proceeded to capture the town of Prelog, followed by the villages of Donji Kraljevec and Goričan, before advancing to the Mura bridge south of Letenye to block the main road to Budapest. The forces advancing from the West were split in two. Major Ivo Henneberg advanced from Središče ob Dravi in Styria towards Čakovec with the objective of securing the left bank of Drava and joining Perko in Čakovec – securing Perko's left flank. The second part of the force advancing from Styria moved through the villages of Štrigova and Sveti Martin na Muri. It was led by Captain Erminije Jurišić and tasked with capturing bridges in Mursko Središće and nearby pontoon ferries. Other ferries located further downstream were the assigned targets for capture by a cavalry squadron led by Captain Matija Čanić.

By 10 a.m., the attacking force gained control of the entire southern bank of the Mura river in the region and Čakovec was surrounded. Perko sent Georgijević to ride into Čakovec and request surrender of the town after sixteen Hungarian soldiers posted to guard southern approach to Čakovec were captured. Györy agreed under protest and formally surrendered near the town's railway station at 10:30 while Perko's forces took positions in the town. Györy pointed out that he did not recognise any new authority and that the attackers had violated the Armistice of Belgrade. Perko informed Kvaternik of the capture of Čakovec at 11 a.m. by telephone and Kvaternik drove to the town to meet with Györy. A passenger train was seized in Čakovec and emptied of passengers before it was boarded by half a battalion of infantry led by Sertić. They took the train to the village of Kotoriba and disembarked there to secure the last remaining unoccupied part of Međimurje – between that village and Legrad near the confluence of Mura and Drava. Sertić completed the task by 1 p.m., placing the entire Međimurje region under control of the forces led by Kvaternik without armed resistance. Contemporary media reported the deaths of three Hungarian soldiers in the offensive. There were no reports of any deaths among the attacking force.

Aftermath

In the afternoon of 24 December, Kvaternik had a letter distributed to clergy in Međimurje instructing them to read his proclamation urging the population to recognise the new authorities. The letter, declaring that Međimurje belonged to the Kingdom of SHS from that day, was read at the Midnight Mass that day – concluded with a rendition of anthem Lijepa naša domovino. The regional committee of the National Council scheduled a public assembly in Čakovec for 9 January 1919. On 25 December, a representative of Hungarian government arrived to request an explanation for the incursion from Kvaternik before returning to Budapest the same day. Perko was appointed civilian and military administrator of Međimurje. Among his first acts in the role were establishment of Međimurske novine and banning of Hungarian language Muraköz newspapers. The regional committee of the National Council sent a telegram to the Regent Alexander informing him of addition of Međimurje to the country (referred to as "Yugoslavia") on 24 December, and the Regent telegraphed them back a congratulatory message on New Year's Eve.

Approximately 10,000 people gathered at the public assembly on 9 January. The assembly adopted a resolution declaring Međimurje was seceding from Hungary and becoming a part of the Kingdom of SHS. The declaration, telegraphed to the Regent Alexander, made references to the principle of self-determination and praised US President Woodrow Wilson as a champion of that principle. Provisions of the declaration were upheld by the Paris Peace Conference when it defined Hungarian borders through the Treaty of Trianon.

During World War II, following the 1941 invasion of Yugoslavia, Međimurje was captured and annexed by Hungary. The puppet state of the Independent State of Croatia, established by the Axis powers in 1941, unsuccessfully disputed the Hungarian possession of Međimurje. The region was liberated in the final weeks of the war by the Bulgarian Armed Forces. Following the breakup of Yugoslavia, Međimurje became part of Croatia. Since 2005, 9 January is celebrated there as a memorial day in remembrance of the 1919 resolution to break away from Hungary.

Notes

References

Sources

1918 in Croatia
1918 in Hungary
1918 in Yugoslavia
Yugoslav unification
December 1918 events